The Prairie River is a small river that flows  through Branch and St. Joseph counties in Michigan.

Drainage basin 
The Prairie River drains all or portions of the following:
 Branch County, Michigan
 Bethel Township
 Bronson Township
 Gilead Township
 Kinderhook Township
 Noble Township
 Ovid Township
 St. Joseph County
 Burr Oak Township
 Colon Township
 Fawn River Township
 Lockport Township
 Nottawa Township
 Sherman Township
 Steuben County, Indiana
 Jamestown Township
 Millgrove Township

Tributaries 
(from the mouth)
 (right) Spring Creek
 Nottawa Ditch
 Colon Ditch
 Washburn Lake
 Beaver Drain
 Beaver Lake
 Lake Templene is formed by an impoundment on the river
 (right) outflow from Bryant Lake
 (left) outflow from Perrin Lake
 Prairie River Lake, a natural lake on the river
 (left) outflow from Fish Lake
 outflow from Hawkins Lake
 outflow from Eight Foot Lake
 outflow from Grey Lake
 outflow from Omena Lake
 (left) Stewart Lake Drain
 Stewart Lake
 (left) outflow from Lake Pleasant
 outflow from Lake Michiana (Hog Lake)
 (left) outflow from Dragon Lake,

References 

Rivers of Michigan
Rivers of Branch County, Michigan
Rivers of St. Joseph County, Michigan
Rivers of Steuben County, Indiana
Tributaries of Lake Michigan